Nada is an unincorporated community in Powell County, Kentucky, United States.

History
Nada had its start in the year 1911 when the railroad was extended to that point; a sawmill was built there the same year. The community lent its name to the nearby Nada Tunnel, originally a railroad tunnel completed in 1911. The post office serving Nada was called Lombard. This post office was established in 1901, and remained in operation until 1968.

References

Unincorporated communities in Powell County, Kentucky
Unincorporated communities in Kentucky